Bourbon Township is an inactive township in Knox County, in the U.S. state of Missouri.

Bourbon Township was established in 1872, and named for the fact a large share of the early settlers were Bourbon Democrats.

References

Townships in Missouri
Townships in Knox County, Missouri